The men's 100 metres sprint event at the 1936 Olympic Games in Berlin, Germany, were held at Olympiastadion on 2 and 3 August. The final was won by American Jesse Owens, and teammate Ralph Metcalfe repeated as silver medalist. Tinus Osendarp of the Netherlands won that nation's first medal in the men's 100 metres, a bronze.

Background

This was the tenth time the event was held, having appeared at every Olympics since the first in 1896. Two finalists from 1932 returned: silver medalist Ralph Metcalfe and 6th-place finisher Takayoshi Yoshioka. The favorite, however, was Jesse Owens, particularly with compatriot Eulace Peacock injured and unable to make the team (Owens had come in third to Peacock and Metcalfe at the 1935 AAU meet).

Afghanistan, Colombia, Liechtenstein, Malta, Peru, and Yugoslavia were represented in the event for the first time. The United States was the only nation to have appeared at each of the first ten Olympic men's 100 metres events.

Competition format

The event retained the four round format from 1920–1932: heats, quarterfinals, semifinals, and a final. There were 12 heats, of 4–6 athletes each, with the top 2 in each heat advancing to the quarterfinals. The 24 quarterfinalists were placed into 4 heats of 6 athletes. The top 3 in each quarterfinal advanced to the semifinals. There were 2 heats of 6 semifinalists, once again with the top 3 advancing to the 6-man final.

Records
These are the standing world and Olympic records (in seconds) prior to the 1932 Summer Olympics.

Jesse Owens equalled the standing Olympic record with 10.3 seconds in the final heat of the first round. He matched his own world record of 10.2 seconds, set two months earlier, in the quarterfinals but this result was not counted for records purposes due to wind assistance. His final run, also disqualified from record consideration due to wind, again matched the Olympic record of 10.3 seconds.

Results

Heats

The fastest two runners in each of the twelve heats advanced to the quarterfinal round.

Heat 1

Heat 2

Heat 3

Heat 4

Heat 5

Heat 6

Heat 7

Heat 8

Heat 9

Heat 10

Heat 11

Heat 12

Quarterfinals

The fastest three runners in each of the four heats advanced to the semifinal round.

Quarterfinal 1

Quarterfinal 2

The wind assistance in this quarterfinal was too great for Owens's 10.2 seconds to count to match the world record or better the Olympic record.

Quarterfinal 3

Quarterfinal 4

Semifinals

The fastest three runners in each of the two heats advanced to the final round.

Semifinal 1

Semifinal 2

Final
Wind: +2.7 m/s

After 30 metres, Owens "had already decided the race in his favour." Metcalfe broke free for silver at 70 metres. Strandberg strained a ligament at the halfway mark.

References

Athletics at the 1936 Summer Olympics
100 metres at the Olympics
Men's events at the 1936 Summer Olympics